The Independence Day Cup is an Indian football tournament held in Nagaon, Assam and organised by Nowgong Sports Association annually. It is the oldest and one of the most reputed football tournaments in Assam first started in 1947, days after the Indian independence, by Nagaon Marwari Yubak Sangha.

Venues
Most of the matches are being played in the Nurul Amin Stadium, Nagaon, which has the capacity of 5,000 spectators.

Results

See also
Bordoloi Trophy
ATPA Shield
Bodousa Cup
Bodoland Martyrs Gold Cup

References

Football cup competitions in India
Football in Assam
1947 establishments in India
Recurring sporting events established in 1947